André De Nul (born 14 July 1946) is a Belgian former footballer who played as a forward and made three appearances for the Belgium national team.

Career
De Nul made his debut for Belgium on 3 February 1971 in a UEFA Euro 1972 qualifying match against Scotland, which finished as a 3–0 win. He went on to make three appearances in 1971, scoring two goals, but received no further call-ups.

Career statistics

International

International goals

References

External links
 
 
 
 André De Nul at Kicker.de
 

1946 births
Living people
People from Lebbeke
Footballers from East Flanders
Belgian footballers
Belgium international footballers
Belgian expatriate footballers
Belgian expatriate sportspeople in Germany
Expatriate footballers in Germany
Association football forwards
S.C. Eendracht Aalst players
Lierse S.K. players
R.S.C. Anderlecht players
Royale Union Saint-Gilloise players
Rot-Weiss Essen players
Belgian Pro League players
Challenger Pro League players
Belgian Third Division players
2. Bundesliga players